An audio file format is a file format for storing digital audio data on a computer system. The bit layout of the audio data (excluding metadata) is called the audio coding format and can be uncompressed, or compressed to reduce the file size, often using lossy compression. The data can be a raw bitstream in an audio coding format, but it is usually embedded in a container format or an audio data format with defined storage layer.

Format types
It is important to distinguish between the audio coding format, the container containing the raw audio data, and an audio codec. A codec performs the encoding and decoding of the raw audio data while this encoded data is (usually) stored in a container file. Although most audio file formats support only one type of audio coding data (created with an audio coder), a multimedia container format (as Matroska or AVI) may support multiple types of audio and video data.

There are three major groups of audio file formats:

 Uncompressed audio formats, such as WAV, AIFF, AU or raw header-less PCM;
 Formats with lossless compression, such as FLAC, Monkey's Audio (filename extension .ape), WavPack (filename extension .wv), TTA, ATRAC Advanced Lossless, ALAC (filename extension .m4a), MPEG-4 SLS, MPEG-4 ALS, MPEG-4 DST, Windows Media Audio Lossless (WMA Lossless), and Shorten (SHN).
 Formats with lossy compression, such as Opus, MP3, Vorbis, Musepack, AAC, ATRAC and Windows Media Audio Lossy (WMA lossy).

Uncompressed audio format

One major uncompressed audio format, LPCM, is the same variety of PCM as used in Compact Disc Digital Audio and is the format most commonly accepted by low level audio APIs and D/A converter hardware. Although LPCM can be stored on a computer as a raw audio format, it is usually stored in a .wav file on Windows or in a .aiff file on macOS. The Audio Interchange File Format (AIFF) format is based on the Interchange File Format (IFF), and the WAV format is based on the similar Resource Interchange File Format (RIFF). WAV and AIFF are designed to store a wide variety of audio formats, lossless and lossy; they just add a small, metadata-containing header before the audio data to declare the format of the audio data, such as LPCM with a particular sample rate, bit depth, endianness and number of channels. Since WAV and AIFF are widely supported and can store LPCM, they are suitable file formats for storing and archiving an original recording.

BWF (Broadcast Wave Format) is a standard audio format created by the European Broadcasting Union as a successor to WAV. Among other enhancements, BWF allows more robust metadata to be stored in the file. See European Broadcasting Union: Specification of the Broadcast Wave Format (EBU Technical document 3285, July 1997). This is the primary recording format used in many professional audio workstations in the television and film industry. BWF files include a standardized timestamp reference which allows for easy synchronization with a separate picture element. Stand-alone, file based, multi-track recorders from AETA, Sound Devices, Zaxcom, HHB Communications Ltd, Fostex, Nagra, Aaton, and TASCAM all use BWF as their preferred format.

Lossless compressed audio format
A lossless compressed audio format stores data in less space without losing any information. The original, uncompressed data can be recreated from the compressed version.

Uncompressed audio formats encode both sound and silence with the same number of bits per unit of time. Encoding an uncompressed minute of absolute silence produces a file of the same size as encoding an uncompressed minute of music. In a lossless compressed format, however, the music would occupy a smaller file than an uncompressed format and the silence would take up almost no space at all.

Lossless compression formats include FLAC, WavPack, Monkey's Audio, ALAC (Apple Lossless). They provide a compression ratio of about 2:1 (i.e. their files take up half the space of PCM). Development in lossless compression formats aims to reduce processing time while maintaining a good compression ratio.

Lossy compressed audio format
Lossy audio format enables even greater reductions in file size by removing some of the audio information and simplifying the data. This, of course, results in a reduction in audio quality, but a variety of techniques are used, mainly by exploiting psychoacoustics, to remove the parts of the sound that have the least effect on perceived quality, and to minimize the amount of audible noise added during the process. The popular MP3 format is probably the best-known example, but the AAC format found on the iTunes Music Store is also common. Most formats offer a range of degrees of compression, generally measured in bit rate. The lower the rate, the smaller the file and the more significant the quality loss.

List of formats

See also 
 Video file format
 Audio compression (data)
 Comparison of audio coding formats
 Comparison of video container formats
 Comparison of video codecs
 List of open-source audio codecs
 Timeline of audio formats

References

Digital container formats